XEMN-AM is a radio station on 600 AM in Monterrey, Nuevo León, Mexico. It is owned by Grupo Radio Centro and operated by Grupo Acustik as Arre en Acustik. The frequency is currently silent.

History
XEMN received its concession on March 4, 1955. It was owned by Mario Quintanilla García until 1973.

In 2015, Emisoras Incorporadas de Monterrey was replaced by Radio Emisora XHSP-FM as the concessionaire as part of a restructuring of the stations then owned by Grupo Radio México. GRM merged with corporate cousin Grupo Radio Centro in 2016.

On September 2, 2019, La Regiomontana left the air after 52 years; it changed to Acustik Radio with a regional Mexican format. That same day, Acustik began programming two other former Radio Centro AM stations, XEUNO-AM in Guadalajara and XEJP-AM in Mexico City.

References

1955 establishments in Mexico
Grupo Radio Centro
Mexican radio stations with expired concessions
Radio stations established in 1955
Radio stations in Monterrey
Regional Mexican radio stations
Spanish-language radio stations